Francis Joseph Galbraith (December 9, 1913 – June 25, 1986) was a United States diplomat and member of the American Academy of Political and Social Science.

He was born on December 9, 1913 in Timber Lake, Dewey County, South Dakota and worked as cowboy and rodeo rider on his father's ranch near the Cheyenne River Sioux Indian Reservation until he attended the University of Puget Sound receiving a B.A. in History in 1939 and a B.A. in librarianship from the University of Washington in 1940. He attained the rank of Captain while serving in the U.S. Army in the South Pacific from 1941 to 1942, and joined the Foreign Service in 1946 serving as U.S. Vice Consul in Hamburg, 1946–48; Batavia, 1949–50. After serving as U.S. chargé d'affaires in Indonesia, he was appointed U.S. Ambassador to Singapore, 1966–69 and Indonesia 1969–74.

After retiring from the State Department he worked for the Bechtel Corporation, Freeport Indonesia, Weyerhaeuser Company and Intermaritime Management as a consultant on international affairs. He was survived by his wife Martha Townsley Fisher; a daughter, Susan, of Boston, and a son, Kelly, of Jakarta.

References

External links
1969 Confidential report by Ambassador Galbraith on OPM and West Irian

1913 births
1986 deaths
People from Dewey County, South Dakota
University of Puget Sound alumni
University of Washington Information School alumni
United States Army personnel of World War II
Ambassadors of the United States to Singapore
Ambassadors of the United States to Indonesia
United States Foreign Service personnel
United States Army officers